Rinzler may refer to:

J. W. Rinzler (1962-2021), film historian
Ralph Rinzler (1934–1994), mandolin player and folksinger
Rinzler (Tron), character in the Tron film series